Ricardo Mena (born 22 December 1971) is a Paraguayan former professional tennis player.

Mena, who had a best singles world ranking of 279, played Davis Cup for Paraguay from 1990 to 1998, then appeared in further ties in 2003 and 2008. During his Davis Cup career he won a total of 19 rubbers for his country. He also played collegiate tennis for Flagler College in Florida, where he was a three-time NAIA All-American.

ATP Challenger finals

Doubles: 1 (0–1)

References

External links
 
 
 

1971 births
Living people
Paraguayan male tennis players
Flagler College alumni
College men's tennis players in the United States
Tennis players at the 2003 Pan American Games
Pan American Games competitors for Paraguay
21st-century Paraguayan people
20th-century Paraguayan people